Arkadiusz Rojek (born 6 July 1972) was a Polish football player who spent different points of his career playing as a defender and as a forward.

Biography

Born in Gdańsk, Rojek started playing with his local team Lechia Gdańsk. After progressing through the Lechia youth teams he made his senior debut on 4 October 1989 against Igloopol Dębica. In his first season with Lechia he made 4 league appearances in the II liga, Poland's second division. After not making any appearances the following season Rojek joined Wisła Tczew for a short six-month spell before returning to Lechia. He spent seven seasons with Lechia, but rarely found himself in the squad during this time. The 1994–95 season is the season in which he made the most appearances during this time, making 3 appearances in the league. His final appearance came for the club the following season, this time in the III liga, Poland's third division. In 1999 he joined Bałtyk Gdynia, during which time he made 8 appearances in his six months with the club. Rojek once again returned to Lechia, during this time the club was known as Lechia-Polonia Gdańsk due to a merger between Lechia Gdańsk and Polonia Gdańsk, however during this season Rojek did not feature for the first team. In total for Lechia he spent 9 seasons with the club and made 9 appearances in all competitions. He left Lechia for a final time and returned to Bałtyk Gdynia for the 2000–01 season, however it is not documented that he made any appearances during his second spell with the club. In 2001 Rojek moved to Italy and spent two seasons with Polisportiva Parrocchiale Borgo Grappa playing with the Italian club until 2003. In 2005 he returned to Poland and played the second half of the season with Unia Tczew, making 3 appearances before his retirement from football at the end of the season.

In 2016 Rojek had his first role in management, being the manager of the KP Zaspa Gdańsk team. He wasn't in this role for long however, also leaving the job as the clubs manager in 2016.

References

1972 births
Living people
Polish footballers
Lechia Gdańsk players
Bałtyk Gdynia players
Unia Tczew players
Association football defenders
Association football forwards
Polish expatriate footballers
Expatriate footballers in Italy
Polish expatriate sportspeople in Italy